The 1950 Fordham Rams football team represented Fordham University as an independent during the 1950 college football season.  The Rams went 8–1 and scored 174 points while their defense allowed 123 points.  Despite an 8-1 record, Fordham finished the season unranked and were left out of any postseason play, although they did get strong consideration from the Gator Bowl.  Ultimately, a poor strength of schedule—Fordham's opponents combined for a dismal 28–53–4 mark–in what was a weak year for the entire Eastern region and a belief that Fordham would not travel well—Fordham only averaged about 10,000 fans per home game—kept them home during bowl season.  Still, their .889 win percentage (the 1937 team had a .933 win percentage while going 7–0–1) is tied for second best in school history.

Schedule

References

Fordham
Fordham Rams football seasons
Fordham Rams football